Frederick Wehba (born February 23, 1947) is an American real-estate investor and founder of the firm BentleyForbes.

Personal life 
Wehba was born and raised in Texas. He describes his childhood that he spent working in his father's grocery store. He received a bachelor's degree from University of North Texas. Wehba has been married to his wife, Susan, since 1969. They have four children. They currently reside in the Los Angeles area. Wehba identifies as a Christian.

Career 
In 1969, Wehba began his real-estate career by purchasing a small grocery store. His early focus was primarily grocery and retail shopping centers throughout Oklahoma and Texas. Wehba expanded his business throughout the 70s and, by 1983 real estate dominated the majority of his time, leading to the formation of a national commercial real estate investment company. Wehba founded the Los Angeles-based Bentley Forbes firm in 1993.

Philanthropy 
Wehba has served his community through involvement with a variety of organizations including California Baptist University, The Dove Foundation, In Christ Church, The Alliance for College-Ready Public Schools, the Cedar-Sinai Medical Center, the Church at Beverly Hills, the Muscular Dystrophy Association and the Institute for Social and Economic Policy on the Middle East. He is a highly active member of the Jeffrey Foundation, which offers child care and counseling for families in southern California.

Awards and honors 

Frederick has received several awards for his contributions:
 Eagle Scout status with Gold Palms.
 1990 Man of the Year by the city of Los Angeles.
 Who's Who of American Business Leaders.
 Designation of President Emeritus from the Association of Breast Cancer Studies (ABCs).
 The Muscular Dystrophy Association Humanitarian Award.
 Spirit of Excellence Award from California Baptist University.

References 

1947 births
Living people
American real estate businesspeople
20th-century American businesspeople
21st-century American businesspeople
University of North Texas alumni